Omnia Township is a township in Cowley County, Kansas, USA.  As of the 2000 census, its population was 357.

Geography

The streams of Lower Dutch Creek, Mud Creek and Upper Dutch Creek run through this township.

References
 USGS Geographic Names Information System (GNIS)

External links
 City-Data.com

Townships in Cowley County, Kansas
Townships in Kansas